Sambommatsu Station (三本松駅) is the name of two train stations in Japan:

Sambommatsu Station (Kagawa)
 Sambommatsu Station (Nara)